Quantum spin tunneling, or quantum tunneling of magnetization,  is a physical phenomenon by which the quantum mechanical state that describes the collective magnetization of a nanomagnet  is a linear superposition of two states with well defined and opposite magnetization.    Classically,  the  magnetic anisotropy favors neither of the two states with opposite magnetization, so that the system has two equivalent  ground states.

Because of the quantum spin tunneling, an energy splitting between the bonding and anti-bonding linear combination of states with opposite magnetization  classical ground states arises, giving rise to a unique ground state separated by the first excited state by   an energy difference  known as quantum spin tunneling splitting. The quantum spin tunneling splitting  also occurs for pairs of excited states with opposite magnetization.

As a consequence of quantum spin tunneling,  the magnetization of a system can switch between states with opposite magnetization that are separated by an energy barrier much larger than thermal energy. Thus, quantum spin tunneling provides a pathway to magnetization switching forbidden in classical physics.

Whereas quantum spin tunneling shares some properties with quantum tunneling  in other  two level systems such as a single electron  in a double quantum well or in a diatomic  molecule, it is a multi-electron phenomenon, since more than one electron is required to have magnetic anisotropy. The multi-electron character is also revealed by an important feature, absent in single-electron tunneling: zero field quantum spin tunneling splitting is only possible for integer spins, and is certainly absent for half-integer spins,  as ensured by Kramers degeneracy theorem. In real systems containing Kramers ions, like crystalline samples of single ion magnets, the degeneracy of the ground states is frequently lifted through dipolar interactions with neighboring spins, and as such quantum spin tunneling is frequently observed even in the absence of an applied external field for these systems.

Initially discussed in the context of magnetization dynamics of  magnetic nanoparticles, the concept was known as macroscopic quantum tunneling,   a term that highlights both the difference with single electron tunneling and connects this phenomenon with other macroscopic quantum phenomena.  In this sense,  the  problem of quantum spin tunneling lies in the boundary between the quantum and classical descriptions of reality.

Single spin Hamiltonian 

A simple single spin  Hamiltonian that describes quantum spin tunneling  for a spin  is given by:

                                                               [1]

In the case of integer spins  the second term of the Hamiltonian results in the splitting of the otherwise degenerate ground state doublet. In this case, the zero field  quantum spin tunneling splitting is given by:

From this result, it is apparent that, given that E/D is much smaller than 1 by construction,  the quantum spin tunnelling splitting becomes suppressed in  the limit of large spin S,  i.e., as we move from the atomic scale towards the macroscopic world.  The magnitude of the quantum spin tunnelling splitting can be modulated by application of a magnetic field along the transverse hard axis direction (in the case of Hamiltonian [1],  with D<0 and E>0,  the x axis). The modulation of the quantum spin tunnelling splitting results in oscillations of its magnitude, including specific values of the transverse field at which the splitting  vanishes. This accidental degeneracies are known as diabolic points.

Observation 

Quantum  tunneling of the magnetization was reported in 1996 for a crystal of Mn12ac molecules with S=10.   Quoting Thomas and coworkers, "in an applied magnetic field, the magnetization shows hysteresis loops with a distinct 'staircase' structure: the steps occur at values of the applied field where the energies of different collective spin states of the manganese clusters coincide. At these special values of the field, relaxation from one spin state to another is enhanced above the thermally activated rate by the action of resonant quantum-mechanical tunneling". Quantum tunneling of the magnetization was reported in ferritin present in horse spleen proteins

A direct measurement of the quantum spin tunneling splitting energy can be achieved using  single spin  scanning tunneling inelastic spectroscopy, that permits to measure the spin excitations of individual atoms on surfaces.  Using this technique, the  spin excitation spectrum  of an individual integer spin   was obtained by Hirjibehedin et al. for a S=2 single Fe atom on a surface of Cu2N/Cu(100), that made it possible to measure a quantum spin tunneling splitting of 0.2 meV.   Using the same technique other groups measured the spin excitations of  S=1 Fe phthalocyanine   molecule on a copper surface and a S=1 Fe  atom on InSb, both of which had a quantum spin tunneling splitting  of the   doublet larger than 1 meV.

In the case of molecular magnets with large S and small E/D ratio, indirect   measurement techniques are required to infer the value of the quantum spin tunneling splitting. For instance, modeling time dependent magnetization measurements of a crystal of Fe8  molecular magnets with the Landau-Zener formula,   Wernsdorfer and Sessoli  inferred tunneling splittings in the range of 10−7 Kelvin.

References 

Condensed matter physics
Magnetism
Quantum mechanics